Charles Gustavus Adolphus Drucker (born 1 May 1868, Amsterdam, died 10 December 1903, New York City) was a Conservative Member of Parliament for Northampton.

References

External links 

Conservative Party (UK) MPs for English constituencies
UK MPs 1895–1900
1868 births
1903 deaths